Jon Larsen (born 1959) is a Norwegian gypsy jazz guitarist and painter.

Jon Larsen may also refer to:

Jon Larsen (Danish musician)
Jonathan Larsen, American journalist

See also
John Larsen (disambiguation)
Jonathan Larson (1960–1996), American composer and playwright